Foreign relations between Germany and Tonga began on 1 May, 1976.

The German embassy in Wellington is also responsible for Tonga. A German honorary consulate is active in Nukuʻalofa. Tonga's embassy in the United Kingdom is also responsible for Germany. There are also honorary consulates in Düsseldorf and Hamburg.

History
19th century German settlers migration to Tonga while relatively small in numbers, was distinct from other German settler communities in the New World in showing proportionally high, fast and almost complete assimilation into the local culture.

In 1876 Germany signed a treaty of friendship with Tonga, and leased space for a coaling station at Neiafu in Vavaʻu. The political background of the Treaty of Friendship of 1876 was the heyday of imperialism and colonialism in the Pacific Islands.  During this phase, various great powers (including the German Empire) fought over the division of the region. In 1878 Emperor Wilhelm I sent King George Tupou I a life-sized portrait of himself. This was followed in 1879 by awarding him the Order of the Red Eagle. In the Samoa Treaty of 1899, Germany recognised the Tonga Islands as part of Britain's sphere of interests. In 1900, Tonga became a British protectorate, and Germany's rights were ceded to Britain. During World War I, New Zealand recruited Tongans to fight Germany in the New Zealand Expeditionary Force.

Germany showed a renewed interest in Tonga in 1976, when the Soviet Union proposed establishing a base there, re-establishing diplomatic relations, renewing the Treaty of Friendship, and granting bilateral aid for the first time.

King Tāufaʻāhau Tupou IV visited West Germany in 1980.

In 2016 the President of the Bundestag Norbert Lammert visited the island to mark 140 years of relations between the two countries.

References

General bibliography 
 
 

Tonga
Bilateral relations of Tonga